Stephanie Richardson (born 11 February 1977) is a Canadian swimmer. She competed in the women's 800 metre freestyle event at the 1996 Summer Olympics.

References

External links
 

1977 births
Living people
Olympic swimmers of Canada
Swimmers at the 1996 Summer Olympics
Swimmers from Toronto
Commonwealth Games medallists in swimming
Commonwealth Games bronze medallists for Canada
Canadian female freestyle swimmers
Swimmers at the 1994 Commonwealth Games
Medallists at the 1994 Commonwealth Games